France Bleu is a network of local and regional radio stations in France, part of the national public broadcasting group Radio France. The network has a public service mission to serve local audiences and provides local news and content from each of its forty-four stations.

France Bleu was created in 2000 by a fusion of two older Radio France networks, Les locales de Radio France and Radio Bleue. The flagship station in Paris goes by the name of France Bleu 107.1, while the individual stations are each named for their respective coverage areas, usually a département, région, or city.

Claude Perrier has been director of the France Bleu network since 2013. His predecessors include Philippe Chaffanjon (2012–2013) and Anne Brucy (2010–2012).

History

Disjointed beginnings (1975–2000)

Les locales de Radio France
In 1980, Jacqueline Baudrier, then Chief Director of Radio France created three new experimental local radio stations. Fréquence Nord, Radio Mayenne and Melun FM were created to cover a region, départment and a town respectively. These stations were in complement to those already existing under the management of FR3 since 1975, following the break-up of the state broadcaster ORTF. Radio France assumed control of all stations in 1982, with the number of stations reaching 40 by the 1990s.

Its programming was essentially local except for music (which usually came from sister station FIP, or national programming by satellite, called Programme Modulation France), combined with news bulletins from France Inter. These stations were individually called Radio France_ followed by its coverage area, but were grouped under the name Les locales de Radio France.

Radio Bleue
Similarly in 1980, Baudrier also launched a new network, this time aimed at the over-50 demographic, called Radio Bleue. It started as a morning-only service which used a national mediumwave network, shared with educational programming. By the 1990s, it expanded its schedule, broadcasting until the evening and secured three FM frequencies from the radio regulator the CSA in three cities: Paris, Cannes, and Valence.

Plan Bleu (2000–2010)
In 2000, following a review of all radio services, Radio France director, Jean-Marie Cavada, initiated its Plan Bleu, essentially a vast re-organisation of its radio frequencies. Under the plan the local radio stations (Les locales de Radio France) were to be syndicated with Radio Bleue to form one network – the unified France Bleu officially launched on 4 September 2000 at 5:00am CET. Its network of thirty-eight local radio stations were all renamed "France Bleu __", followed by its broadcast area, to bring the network closer to the Radio France family of stations. Expanding its coverage, local FM frequencies in small to medium-sized towns were reattributed to France Bleu. Under the same plan frequencies in bigger markets switched to youth network Le Mouv' and FIP stations were drastically cut back to five locations.

News bulletins from France Inter were gradually replaced with its own service, and journalists for the local stations now supply rolling news station France Info with news items, having previously relied on its bigger sister stations for news.

Paris region
2002 marked the arrival of a dedicated local service for the Paris region, with the launch of La CityRadio de Paris, using the 107.1 frequency from the previous Radio Bleue FM network. Conversely the France Bleu network handed over the totality of its mediumwave network to France Info.

In 2005 Radio France chief Jeal-Paul Cluzel wished to create a regional station, finding the CityRadio name too limiting, therefore nearby France Bleu Melun based sixty kilometres away was slated for a merger, signalling closure on 16 December 2005 after more than twenty-five years on-air. The combined stations were re-launched as a single service, France Bleu Île-de-France, on 2 January 2006. The name was changed to France Bleu 107.1 in September 2009.

Expansion and validation (2010–present)
The value of France Bleu was starting to be more widely recognised. In April 2000, the network achieved its record audience, achieving a 7.5% share and 330,000 new listeners, putting the national listenership at under 4 million.
In 2010 at the request of French Prime Minister François Fillon, France Bleu Maine, covering Le Mans and La Sarthe was created on 1 June. Mr Fillon is a native of Le Mans. 
In 2011 it was confirmed that local public radio is to appear in Toulouse. France Bleu Toulouse launched on 23 February  and marked a return of local public radio to the city after a 14-year absence. Its previous outlet, Radio France Toulouse was closed in order to make way for national youth station Le Mouv'. Le Mouv' has since relocated to Paris. The 44th station was launched in September 2013: France Bleu Saint-Etienne Loire. Based in Saint-Etienne, the local radio covers the city of Saint-Etienne, Roanne and a part of La Loire.

Slogans
 1991–2000: Les locales
 2000–2002: Toutes les FranceS sont sur France Bleu
 2002–2005: La vie tout en bleu
 2005–2008: Vivre en bleu, c'est mieux
 Since August 2008: Vu d'ici

Regional stations and their main frequencies

References

External links

Radio France Website

Radio France
Radio stations established in 2000
2000 establishments in France